The Evangelical Lutheran Church in Southern Africa (Cape Church) is a Lutheran church in some of the Western Provinces of South Africa. The Cape Church is a member of the Lutheran World Federation. It has 4,223 baptized members.

References

Lutheran World Federation members
Lutheranism in South Africa
Lutheranism in Africa